First entering service in 1988, the M58 Mine Clearing Line Charge (MICLIC) is a rocket-projected explosive line charge which provides a "close-in" demining capability for maneuver forces of the United States Army and Marine Corps. It is effective against conventionally fuzed land mines and, when detonated, it provides a lane 8 meters by 100 meters (8.75 yards by 109 yards).

Technical specification 
The MICLIC system consists of an M353 3½ ton (3,175 kg) or M200A1 2½ ton (2,268 kg) trailer (or M200 tracked trailer) chassis, a launcher assembly, an M147 firing kit, an M58A3 line charge and a 5-inch (127mm) MK22 Mod 4 rocket. The line charge is 350 feet (107 meters) long and contains 5 pounds (2.27 kg) per linear foot of C-4 explosive. In the event a MICLIC fails to detonate normally, it can be manually activated by time-delay fuses every few feet along the length of it. The M147 Firing Kit can also be employed from other combat engineer vehicles, namely the M60 AVLB and the M1150 Assault Breacher Vehicle.

Use

Russo-Ukrainian War 
On September 15, 2022, the U.S. Department of Defense announced supply of mine clearing equipment as part of the security assistance package. In November 2022, the Ukrainian military showcased a photo featuring use of M58 MICLIC in Ukraine.

See also
Demining
Mine-clearing line charge

References

External links
M58 Mine Clearing Line Charge (MICLIC) - via FAS

Mine warfare countermeasures
Weapons countermeasures
United States Marine Corps equipment
Military equipment introduced in the 1980s